Starlee Kine (born April 8, 1975) is an American public radio producer and writer. She was the creator and host of the podcast Mystery Show, which was done in production with Gimlet Media. Her work has been featured on This American Life. She was a frequent guest on the CBC Radio show WireTap. Her writing has appeared in the New York Times Magazine and California Sunday.

On April 30, 2015, Gimlet Media announced Kine would be the host of its new podcast, Mystery Show. The show's first episode was released on May 22, 2015.

In early 2016, she was an artist-in-residence at the MacDowell Colony. On March 4, 2016, she presented a sampling of her work and a teaser of a mystery-in-progress at the Monadnock Cultural Center in Peterborough, New Hampshire.

In April 2016, Kine announced that Mystery Show would no longer be produced at Gimlet Media.

Kine served as an editorial advisor on Serial Productions's S-Town podcast.

She has had a few acting roles such as the voice of Tina from the Cartoon Network webseries DIY. She was part of the cast of the first season of The Shivering Truth, an Adult Swim series created by Vernon Chatman.

In March 2020, Kine, along with David Rees and Jon Kimball, returned to host the political podcast Election Profit Makers covering the prediction market website PredictIt in the lead up to the 2020 US presidential election. Kine, Rees and Kimball previously hosted Election Profit Makers prior to the 2016 US presidential election.

Kine was a writer for the television series Search Party.

This American Life work 
 Episode 75 – Kindness of Strangers
 Episode 146 – Urban Nature
 Episode 183 – Missing Parents' Bureau
 Episode 205 – Plan B
 Episode 208 – Office Politics
 Episode 223 – Classifieds
 Episode 226 – Reruns
 Episode 231 – Time to Save the World
 Episode 238 – Lost in Translation
 Episode 248 – Like It Or Not
 Episode 259 – Promised Land
 Episode 261 – The Sanctity of Marriage
 Episode 277 – Apology
 Episode 283 – Remember Me
 Episode 335 – Big Wide World
 Episode 339 – Break-Up
 Episode 354 – Mistakes Were Made 
 Episode 379 – Return to the Scene of the Crime
 Episode 424 – Kid Politics
 Episode 514 – Thought That Counts

References

External links

 It's a Hard Knock This American Life – Starlee Kine profile in The New Yinzer – Spring 2008
  The Moth Presents Starlee Kine: Radical Honesty Starlee Kine gives a humorous (and honest) account of her attendance at a Radical Honesty workshop. From a 2009 Moth Mainstage event.

1975 births
Living people
American radio personalities
American radio producers
American women writers
This American Life people
Gimlet Media
21st-century American women
Women radio producers